Marlies Somers (born 16 January 1973) is a Dutch voice actress  who has been voice-dubbing roles in the Dutch language for many foreign media. In some series she is the title character.
She was born in Gouda. She has a daughter and two sons and a young brother Hans Somers.

Dubbing roles
Animation
Winx Club - Layla
Monster Buster Club - Cathy
Bratz Rock Angelz - Cloe
Bratz Starrin & Stylin - Cloe
The Powerpuff Girls - Bubbles and Princess Morbucks (1999), Bubbles (2016)
Ed, Edd n Eddy - SarahThe Care Bears - Funshine BearRugrats - ZoeyThe Fairly OddParents - VickyFanboy & Chum Chum - Marsha 
Dora the Explorer - Benny the BullTotally Spies! - Dominique 
Olivia - OliviaToy Story 2 - BarbieRocket Power - Otto RocketHey Arnold! - Lila Sawyer and Olga PatakiPolly World Movie - Polly Pocket
The Ghost and Molly McGee - Molly McGee
Anime
Digimon Adventure - Angewomon, Gatomon, Kari Kamiya, T.K. TakaishiPokémon 1997 - MistySailor Moon - Sailor Moon & Bunny TsukinoSailor Moon R - Sailor Moon & Bunny TsukinoLive-action
Teletubbies - PoSesame Street - Prairie Dawn''

References

External links
Marlies Somers official website
About her work

1973 births
Living people
Dutch voice actresses
People from Gouda, South Holland